The pelican barracuda (Sphyraena idiastes) is a predatory fish found in temperate coastal and oceanic waters. They are usually seen in groups of 3-20, from the surface to about 24 m. Pelican barracuda feed mainly on fish . Large individuals may slash prey into pieces before swallowing them.

Distribution

From the tip of Baja California and near Guaymas, in the eastern Gulf of California south to Colombia to Chile, as well as the Galapagos Islands, Cocos Island, and Malpelo Island.

References

External links
 
 
 

Sphyraenidae
Fish described in 1903
Taxa named by Robert Evans Snodgrass
Taxa named by Edmund Heller